The Egypt Volleyball Super Cup is a Volleyball trophy in Egypt. The winner is decided after a competition between the four top ranking teams in Egypt volleyball league . The competition was established in 2002.

Games
The following is a list of all Super Cup games. Winners are indicated in bold with the number in brackets indicating the title number.

References

Super Cup